South Karanpura Coalfield is located in Ramgarh district in the Indian state of Jharkhand.

Overview
In 1917, L.S.S.O’Malley described the coalfields in the upper reaches of the Damodar as follows: "Near the western boundary of Jharia field is that of Bokaro, covering , with an estimated content of 1,500 million tons; close by… is the Ramgarh field (40 square miles), in which, however, coal is believed to be of inferior quality. A still larger field in the same district is that called Karanpura, which extends over"  "and has an estimated capacity of 9,000 million tons."

The Coalfield
The South Karanpura coalfield forms an elongated strip along the Chingara fault. Barkakana railway junction is situated at the south-east edge of the field.

Reserves
Geological reserves in the South Karanpura Coalfield in million tonnes as on 1/4/2010:

Projects

Transport
In 1927, Bengal Nagpur Railway opened the  Barkakana-Muri-Chandil line to traffic. In the same year the Central India Coalfields Railway opened the Gomoh-Barkakana line. It was extended to Daltonganj in 1929. Later these lines were amalgamated with East India Railway.

The Koderma–Hazaribagh–Barkakana–Ranchi line became functional between Koderma and Barkakana in 2015 and 2016.

References

Coalfields of India
Mining in Jharkhand
Ramgarh district